Caesium chloride or cesium chloride is the inorganic compound with the formula CsCl. This colorless salt is an important source of caesium ions in a variety of niche applications. Its crystal structure forms a major structural type where each caesium ion is coordinated by 8 chloride ions. Caesium chloride dissolves in water. CsCl changes to NaCl structure on heating. Caesium chloride occurs naturally as impurities in carnallite (up to 0.002%), sylvite and kainite. Less than 20 tonnes of CsCl is produced annually worldwide, mostly from a caesium-bearing mineral pollucite.

Caesium chloride is widely used medicine structure in isopycnic centrifugation for separating various types of DNA. It is a reagent in analytical chemistry, where it is used to identify ions by the color and morphology of the precipitate. When enriched in radioisotopes, such as 137CsCl or 131CsCl, caesium chloride is used in nuclear medicine applications such as treatment of cancer and diagnosis of myocardial infarction. Another form of cancer treatment was studied using conventional non-radioactive CsCl. Whereas conventional caesium chloride has a rather low toxicity to humans and animals, the radioactive form easily contaminates the environment due to the high solubility of CsCl in water. Spread of 137CsCl powder from a 93-gram container in 1987 in Goiânia, Brazil, resulted in one of the worst-ever radiation spill accidents killing four and directly affecting 249 people.

Crystal structure

The caesium chloride structure adopts a primitive cubic lattice with a two-atom basis, where both atoms have eightfold coordination. The chloride atoms lie upon the lattice points at the corners of the cube, while the caesium atoms lie in the holes in the center of the cubes; an alternative and exactly equivalent 'setting' has the caesium ions at the corners and the chloride ion in the center. This structure is shared with CsBr and CsI and many binary metallic alloys. In contrast, the other alkaline halides have the sodium chloride (rocksalt) structure. When both ions are similar in size (Cs+ ionic radius 174 pm for this coordination number, Cl− 181 pm) the CsCl structure is adopted, when they are different (Na+ ionic radius 102 pm, Cl− 181 pm) the sodium chloride structure is adopted. Upon heating to above 445 °C, the normal caesium chloride structure (α-CsCl) converts to the β-CsCl form with the rocksalt structure (space group Fmm). The rocksalt structure is also observed at ambient conditions in nanometer-thin CsCl films grown on mica, LiF, KBr and NaCl substrates.

Physical properties
Caesium chloride is colorless in the form of large crystals and white when powdered. It readily dissolves in water with the maximum solubility increasing from 1865 g/L at 20 °C to 2705 g/L at 100 °C. The crystals are very hygroscopic and gradually disintegrate at ambient conditions. Caesium chloride does not form hydrates.

In contrast to sodium chloride and potassium chloride, caesium chloride readily dissolves in concentrated hydrochloric acid. Caesium chloride has also a relatively high solubility in formic acid (1077 g/L at 18 °C) and hydrazine; medium solubility in methanol (31.7 g/L at 25 °C) and low solubility in ethanol (7.6 g/L at 25 °C), sulfur dioxide (2.95 g/L at 25 °C), ammonia (3.8 g/L at 0 °C), acetone (0.004% at 18 °C), acetonitrile (0.083 g/L at 18 °C), ethylacetate and other complex ethers, butanone, acetophenone, pyridine and chlorobenzene.

Despite its wide band gap of about 8.35 eV at 80 K, caesium chloride weakly conducts electricity, and the conductivity is not electronic but ionic. The conductivity has a value of the order 10−7 S/cm at 300 °C. It occurs through nearest-neighbor jumps of lattice vacancies, and the mobility is much higher for the Cl− than Cs+ vacancies. The conductivity increases with temperature up to about 450 °C, with an activation energy changing from 0.6 to 1.3 eV at about 260 °C. It then sharply drops by two orders of magnitude because of the phase transition from the α-CsCl to β-CsCl phase. The conductivity is also suppressed by application of pressure (about 10 times decrease at 0.4 GPa) which reduces the mobility of lattice vacancies.

Reactions
Caesium chloride completely dissociates upon dissolution in water, and the Cs+ cations are solvated in dilute solution.  CsCl converts to caesium sulfate upon being heated in concentrated sulfuric acid or heated with caesium hydrogen sulfate at 550–700 °C:

2 CsCl + H2SO4 → Cs2SO4 + 2 HCl
CsCl + CsHSO4 → Cs2SO4 + HCl

Caesium chloride forms a variety of double salts with other chlorides. Examples include 2CsCl·BaCl2, 2CsCl·CuCl2, CsCl·2CuCl and CsCl·LiCl, and with interhalogen compounds:
CsCl + ICl3 -> Cs[ICl4]

Occurrence and production

Caesium chloride occurs naturally as an impurity in the halide minerals carnallite (KMgCl3·6H2O with up to 0.002% CsCl), sylvite (KCl) and kainite (MgSO4·KCl·3H2O), and in mineral waters. For example, the water of Bad Dürkheim spa, which was used in isolation of caesium, contained about 0.17 mg/L of CsCl. None of these minerals are commercially important.

On industrial scale, CsCl is produced from the mineral pollucite, which is powdered and treated with hydrochloric acid at elevated temperature. The extract is treated with antimony chloride, iodine monochloride, or cerium(IV) chloride to give the poorly soluble double salt, e.g.:
CsCl + SbCl3 → CsSbCl4

Treatment of the double salt with hydrogen sulfide gives CsCl:
2 CsSbCl4 + 3 H2S → 2 CsCl + Sb2S3 + 8 HCl

High-purity CsCl is also produced from recrystallized  (and ) by thermal decomposition:

Only about 20 tonnes of caesium compounds, with a major contribution from CsCl, were being produced annually around the 1970s and 2000s worldwide. Caesium chloride enriched with caesium-137 for radiation therapy applications is produced at a single facility Mayak in the Ural Region of Russia and is sold internationally through a UK dealer. The salt is synthesized at 200 °C because of its hygroscopic nature and sealed in a thimble-shaped steel container which is then enclosed into another steel casing. The sealing is required to protect the salt from moisture.

Laboratory methods
In the laboratory, CsCl can be obtained by treating caesium hydroxide, carbonate, caesium bicarbonate, or caesium sulfide with hydrochloric acid:
CsOH + HCl → CsCl + H2O
Cs2CO3 + 2 HCl → 2 CsCl + 2 H2O + CO2

Uses

Precursor to Cs metal
Caesium chloride is the main precursor to caesium metal by high-temperature reduction:
2 CsCl (l) + Mg (l) → MgCl2 (s) + 2 Cs (g)

A similar reaction – heating CsCl with calcium in vacuum in presence of phosphorus – was first reported in 1905 by the French chemist M. L. Hackspill and is still used industrially.

Caesium hydroxide is obtained by electrolysis of aqueous caesium chloride solution:

 2 CsCl + 2 H2O → 2 CsOH + Cl2 + H2

Solute for ultracentrifugation
Caesium chloride is widely used in centrifugation in a technique known as isopycnic centrifugation. Centripetal and diffusive forces establish a density gradient that allow separation of mixtures on the basis of their molecular density. This technique allows separation of DNA of different densities (e.g. DNA fragments with differing A-T or G-C content). This application requires a solution with high density and yet relatively low viscosity, and CsCl suits it because of its high solubility in water, high density owing to the large mass of Cs, as well as low viscosity and high stability of CsCl solutions.

Organic chemistry 
Caesium chloride is rarely used in organic chemistry. It can act as a phase transfer catalyst reagent in selected reactions. One of these reactions is the synthesis of glutamic acid derivatives

where TBAB is tetrabutylammonium bromide (interphase catalyst) and CPME is a cyclopentyl methyl ether (solvent).

Another reaction is substitution of tetranitromethane

where DMF is dimethylformamide (solvent).

Analytical chemistry
Caesium chloride is a reagent in traditional analytical chemistry used for detecting inorganic ions via the color and morphology of the precipitates. Quantitative concentration measurement of some of these ions, e.g. Mg2+, with inductively coupled plasma mass spectrometry, is used to evaluate the hardness of water.

It is also used for detection of the following ions:

Medicine
The American Cancer Society states that "available scientific evidence does not support claims that non-radioactive cesium chloride supplements have any effect on tumors."  The Food and Drug Administration has warned about safety risks, including significant heart toxicity and death, associated with the use of cesium chloride in naturopathic medicine.

Nuclear medicine and radiography
Caesium chloride composed of radioisotopes such as 137CsCl and 131CsCl, is used in nuclear medicine, including treatment of cancer (brachytherapy) and diagnosis of myocardial infarction. In the production of radioactive sources, it is normal to choose a chemical form of the radioisotope which would not be readily dispersed in the environment in the event of an accident. For instance, radiothermal generators (RTGs) often use strontium titanate, which is insoluble in water. For teletherapy sources, however, the radioactive density (Ci in a given volume) needs to be very high, which is not possible with known insoluble caesium compounds. A thimble-shaped container of radioactive caesium chloride provides the active source.

Miscellaneous applications
Caesium chloride is used in the preparation of electrically conducting glasses and screens of cathode ray tubes. In conjunction with rare gases CsCl is used in excimer lamps and excimer lasers.  Other uses include activation of electrodes in welding; manufacture of mineral water, beer and drilling muds; and high-temperature solders. High-quality CsCl single crystals have a wide transparency range from UV to the infrared and therefore had been used for cuvettes, prisms and windows in optical spectrometers; this use was discontinued with the development of less hygroscopic materials.

CsCl is a potent inhibitor of HCN channels, which carry the h-current in excitable cells such as neurons. Therefore, it can be useful in electrophysiology experiments in neuroscience.

Toxicity
Caesium chloride has a low toxicity to humans and animals. Its median lethal dose (LD50) in mice is 2300 mg per kilogram of body weight for oral administration and 910 mg/kg for intravenous injection. The mild toxicity of CsCl is related to its ability to lower the concentration of potassium in the body and partly substitute it in biochemical processes. When taken in large quantities, however, can cause a significant imbalance in potassium and lead to hypokalemia, arrythmia, and acute cardiac arrest. However, caesium chloride powder can irritate the mucous membranes and cause asthma.

Because of its high solubility in water, caesium chloride is highly mobile and can even diffuse through concrete. This is a drawback for its radioactive form which urges a search for less chemically mobile radioisotope materials. Commercial sources of radioactive caesium chloride are well sealed in a double steel enclosure. However, in the Goiânia accident in Brazil, such a source containing about 93 grams of 137CsCl, was stolen from an abandoned hospital and forced open by two scavengers. The blue glow emitted in the dark by the radioactive caesium chloride attracted the thieves and their relatives who were unaware of the associated dangers and spread the powder. This resulted in one of the worst radiation spill accidents in which 4 people died within a month from the exposure, 20 showed signs of radiation sickness, 249 people were contaminated with radioactive caesium chloride, and about a thousand received a dose exceeding a yearly amount of background radiation. More than 110,000 people overwhelmed the local hospitals, and several city blocks had to be demolished in the cleanup operations. In the first days of the contamination, stomach disorders and nausea due to radiation sickness were experienced by several people, but only after several days one person associated the symptoms with the powder and brought a sample to the authorities.

See also
List of ineffective cancer treatments

References

Bibliography

Caesium compounds
Chlorides
Metal halides
Alkali metal chlorides
Caesium chloride crystal structure